Çayırdüzü can refer to:

 Çayırdüzü, Horasan
 Çayırdüzü, Tercan